No-Eared Bunny and Two-Eared Chick is a 2013 German 3D computer-animated children's film directed by Maya Gräfin Rothkirch and Til Schweiger (who also acted as producers), based on a screenplay by Thilo Graf Rothkirch, Klaus Baumgart and Schweiger. Produced by Rothkirch Cartoon-Film in co-production with Warner Bros Entertainment Germany and Barefoot Films, the soundtrack was composed by Dirk Reichardt. No-Eared Bunny and Two-Eared Chick was released in German cinemas on 26 September 2013 by Warner Bros. Pictures, and had a worldwide box office gross of $2,875,527. It received mixed to negative reviews from critics.

Premise 
A bunny born without ears is ostracised by the other bunnies in his town. One day, he finds an egg lying on his doormat. When the Two-Eared Chick finally hatches from the egg, a close friendship flourishes between the two. However, an evil fox threatens their livelihood.

Release 
No-Eared Bunny and Two-Eared Chick was released in German cinemas on 26 September 2013 by Warner Bros. Pictures, where it had an opening gross of $394,998 from 576 theatres. By 30 September, the film had received 42,000 admissions from 589 theatres. No-Eared and Two-Eared Chick ended its German theatrical run with a total gross of $2,416,348. In Belgium and Austria, released on 25 September and 27 September respectively, No-Eared Bunny and Two-Eared Chick grossed an additional $459,179, giving the film a final box office gross of $2,875,527.

References

External links 
 (in German) 

No-Eared Bunny and Two-Eared Chick at filmportal.de (in German)

2013 animated films
2013 3D films
2010s German animated films
German computer-animated films